Howard William Lutnick (born July 14, 1961) is an American billionaire businessman, who succeeded Bernard Gerald Cantor as the head of Cantor Fitzgerald. Lutnick is the chairman and CEO of Cantor Fitzgerald and BGC Partners. After losing 658 employees, including his brother, in the September 11 attacks, Lutnick survived the collapse of towers on the ground, and has become known for his charity efforts through the Cantor Fitzgerald Relief Fund, which helps to aid families of the attacks and natural disasters.

As of September 2018, Lutnick owns 60% of Cantor Fitzgerald, with a net worth of "at least $1.5 billion".

Early life
Howard Lutnick was born to a Jewish family in Jericho, Long Island on July 14, 1961, the son of Solomon Lutnick, a history professor at Queens College and Jane Lutnick, an artist. Lutnick was the middle child of the family, whose siblings were an elder sister Edie and a younger brother Gary.

In 1978, Lutnick was a senior in high school when his mother died of lymphoma. The following year, Lutnick entered Haverford College in Haverford, Pennsylvania. During his first week at school, Lutnick's father died while in a hospital being treated for colon and lung cancers.  A nurse treating Lutnick's father accidentally gave him 100 times the dose of chemotherapy drugs that he was supposed to receive.  Now orphans, Lutnick and his two siblings were largely abandoned by extended family members and instead relied on themselves for support. Lutnick, then 18, was forced to hire a lawyer to settle the debt his father left behind.

The president and dean of Haverford, an institution priding itself on a Quaker heritage, called Lutnick a week after his father's death and offered him a full scholarship for his education there.

Lutnick went on to graduate from Haverford in 1983 with a degree in economics.

Family
On December 10, 1994, Lutnick married Allison Lambert, a law associate at Wilson, Elser, Moskowitz, Edelman & Dicker.  They have four children together, including sons Brandon and Kyle, whose first days of pre-school and kindergarten respectively fell on September 11, 2001. Lutnick was dropping his son off at his kindergarten, which caused him to be late for work, thereby saving his life.

Business career
Lutnick joined Cantor Fitzgerald in 1983, the same year he graduated from college. Early on, Lutnick developed a warm relationship with the firm's founder Bernard Cantor as his personal mentor.  In 1991, Lutnick was named President and CEO of the company, and he became Chairman in 1996.

Lutnick placed a high value on technology early on, and in 1999 made the decision to take eSpeed, an electronic trading subsidiary of Cantor Fitzgerald, public.  This electronic trading system required no brokers, and was a large part of the reason Cantor Fitzgerald was able to remain afloat when 70% of the brokers in their New York office, literally everyone who was in the office that morning, were killed in the September 11 attacks.

In 2004, Lutnick and then head of the London office Lee M. Amaitis decided to split Cantor Fitzgerald into two separate operations. Cantor would continue handling big trades through stock and bond trading desks, while a newly formed BGC Partners would offer broker-driven trading.  This move enabled the two entities to grow independently of each other, but required Cantor to borrow $400 million in loans and go into debt for the first time as a company in order to properly fund BGC's initial growth.  In 2008, Lutnick oversaw the merger of BGC Partners and eSpeed, a deal valued at $1.3 billion.

Lutnick took the video platform Rumble public through a SPAC deal.

September 11 attacks and aftermath

At the time of the September 11 attacks, Cantor Fitzgerald's offices occupied the 101-105th floors in the World Trade Center's North Tower, just above where a hijacked plane hit the building.  None of the employees who were in the Cantor offices that morning survived the attacks. In total, 658 of Cantor's 960 employees died that day, including Lutnick's brother, Gary Lutnick.  Lutnick himself would have been in the office as well that morning, but on September 11 he was taking his son Kyle to his first day of kindergarten. He tried to reach the outskirt of the towers in hope of finding any Cantor staff making it out alive but failed. He survived the collapse of South Tower by taking cover under a car nearby.

In a short time after the attacks, Lutnick made several public appearances, and quickly became one of the most iconic figures from September 11. Because Cantor Fitzgerald lost two-thirds of its workforce, the company was in a vulnerable state, and many observers expected them to close.  Four days after the attacks, on September 15, Lutnick announced amid much controversy, that he would have to stop the paychecks of nearly 700 employees who were missing or had died.

In a televised interview with CNN's Larry King on September 19, Lutnick addressed the issue, saying “I lost everybody in the company… I don't have any money to pay their salaries.”   In that same interview, Lutnick went on to say that while paychecks had been stopped, families of Cantor employees who had died in the attack would receive a 25% share of future Cantor profits for five years as well as health insurance for the next ten years.  Combined, this package totaled more than $100,000 for each family.

In 2006, the firm donated $180 million to the relatives of their employees affected by the 9/11 attack.

In recent years, Lutnick has been featured in events and specials relating to September 11, including the documentary “Out of the Clear Blue Sky” by director Danielle Gardner. The movie theater version prominently featured Mount Hebron Cemetery in Queens, NY. In the DVD version a large portion of cemetery footage and storytelling has been edited out. The cemetery has a clear view of Manhattan including the World Trade Center Towers and current One World Trade Center.

Philanthropy

Cantor Fitzgerald Relief Fund
Just days after the September 11 attacks, Lutnick established the Cantor Fitzgerald Relief Fund as a non-profit organization to aid families of Cantor employees who perished in the attacks of September 11. The fund was started with a $1 million donation from Lutnick himself, and provided assistance for families of 9/11 victims from 14 different companies as well as Cantor.  Lutnick's sister Edie Lutnick, a former labor lawyer, agreed to join the charity as executive director and co-founder.  To date, the fund has given out approximately $180 million to families of Cantor employees and approximately $280 million altogether as the fund has broadened the scope of its efforts to assist victims of natural disasters and other hardships.

Global Charity Day
Each year on September 11 (or the business day closest to September 11 if that day falls on a weekend), Cantor Fitzgerald and its affiliate BGC Partners hold a Global Charity Day event and pledge 100 percent of the day's revenue to charity.  Since 2005, Global Charity Day events have raised approximately $113 million. Celebrities, sports stars and other notable individuals take part in the event on Cantor's and BGC's trading floors by speaking with clients throughout the day.  Previous event participants have included President George W. Bush, President Bill Clinton, Rudy Giuliani, Lady Gaga, Venus Williams, Eli Manning, Susan Sarandon, and Prince Harry, who holds the record for the largest single Global Charity Day trade.

Haverford College
In 2012, Lutnick was appointed to the Haverford College Board of Managers following a term of six years as a vice-chair.  Lutnick endowed five student scholarships at Haverford and funded or led the efforts to fund several campus institutions:
 Cantor Fitzgerald Art Gallery
 Douglas B. Gardner '83 Integrated Athletic Center 
 Gary Lutnick Tennis & Track Center
 Lutnick Library

He has donated $65 million so far.

Hurricane Sandy Relief
When Hurricane Sandy hit New York and New Jersey in October 2012, Lutnick pledged $10 million to aid families who were severely affected by the storm. Cantor Fitzgerald “adopted” 19 schools in communities that were hardest-hit and distributed $1,000 debit cards to nearly 10,000 families in neighborhoods in Brooklyn, Queens, Long Island, Staten Island, and New Jersey. Sen. Charles Schumer and other public figures appeared with Lutnick at several schools. Lutnick, with the assistance of his wife Allison, sister Edie, and team of volunteers and employees, personally distributed the debit cards to parents beginning at Public School 256 in Far Rockaway.

Oklahoma Tornado Relief
After a tornado in Oklahoma killed dozens of people and caused an estimated $2 billion in damage, Lutnick appeared on Piers Morgan Live on CNN and pledged that his companies and the Cantor Relief Fund would donate $2 million to victims of the disaster.

Fundraising for Donald Trump 
On May 16, 2019, Lutnick hosted a fundraiser for Donald Trump at his home in Manhattan, raising some $5 million, according to the President's aide.

Awards and honors
 Ranked #4 Most Important People in Commercial Real Estate Finance by Commercial Observer (2013) 
 FDNY Foundation Humanitarian Award (2013) 
 Ranked #5 Among NJBIZ's "Power 50 Real Estate”  (2012) 
 Worldwide Orphans Foundation honoree (2012) 
 Ranked #18 on Commercial Observer's “Annual Power 100” (2012) 
 New York Junior Tennis & Learning (NYJTL) Leadership Award (2011) 
 Received Department of the Navy Distinguished Public Service Award, the highest Navy award for non-military personnel 
 Federal Enforcement Homeland Security Foundation Honoree 
 Manhattan Youth Baseball Honoree 
 Starlight Children's Foundation Honoree 
 Commencement Speaker at Vanderbilt University

Board memberships
 Fisher Center for Alzheimer's Research Foundation, Vice Chairman 
 Horace Mann School, Board of Trustees 
 National September 11 Memorial & Museum, Board of Directors 
 Haverford College, Board of Managers Co-Chair 
 Intrepid Sea, Air & Space Museum, Board of Trustees Vice Chairman 
 Solomon Guggenheim Museum Foundation Trustee 
 Partnership for New York City Board of Directors

References

Businesspeople from New York (state)
People from Jericho, New York
Haverford College alumni
American financial businesspeople
20th-century American Jews
20th-century American businesspeople
21st-century American businesspeople
1961 births
Living people
American billionaires
21st-century American Jews
Cantor Fitzgerald
Survivors of the September 11 attacks